Brownsville (also known as Brown Sub) is an unincorporated community and census-designated place (CDP) in metropolitan Miami, Florida, United States.  As of the 2010 census, the population was 16,583, up from 15,313 in 2010. After three decades of population loss, Brownsville gained population for the first time in over 40 years in the 2010 US Census.

History
Brownsville was originally a settlement for white families in the 1920s. Black families began moving into the neighborhood between the late 1940s and early 1960s as the population surrounding nearby Liberty Square expanded and many inner-city whites moved to newly built suburban subdivisions surrounding Miami city proper in the wake of World War II.

In 1945, two black couples who lived in Brownsville were arrested and jailed for allegedly mishandling their garbage disposal. That same year, members of the Ku Klux Klan burned crosses in lawns and marched against black home ownership in the area.

By the mid-1960s, Brownsville was a thriving community for black professionals. However, the wake of the Civil Rights Act of 1968 that outlawed restrictive covenants, and riots in 1968 and 1980 brought about the black flight of middle and upper-class families from the community. Brownsville experienced continued population loss from 1970 until 2000, as part of a greater suburbanization trend among the U.S. upwardly-mobile middle class. Between 2000 and 2010, Brownsville gained population for the first time in over 40 years, rising to 15,313 residents.

Construction began on a transit-oriented development, "Brownsville Transit Village", in 2010, on the  site of the Brownsville Metrorail station parking lot. The project cost $100 million to build, and is composed of 467 units in five high-rise residential towers with ground-floor retail centered around the Brownsville Metro station. The project was partially funded by the American Recovery and Reinvestment Act of 2009, and is one of the largest transit-oriented and affordable housing projects in Miami.

Geography
It is bordered to the east and southeast by the city of Miami, to the north by unincorporated Gladeview, to the west by the city of Hialeah, and to the south by unincorporated Miami-Dade County. Interstate 195 (Airport Expressway) forms the southern border of the community.

Demographics

2020 census

Note: the US Census treats Hispanic/Latino as an ethnic category. This table excludes Latinos from the racial categories and assigns them to a separate category. Hispanics/Latinos can be of any race.

2010 census
As of the census of 2000, there were 14,393 people, 4,814 households, and 3,254 families residing in the CDP. The racial makeup of the CDP was 91.23% African American, 5.76% White, 0.22% Native American, 0.02% Asian, 0.01% Pacific Islander, 1.45% from other races, and 1.30% from two or more races. Hispanic or Latino of any race were 8.22% of the population.

There were 4,814 households, out of which 34.3% had children under the age of 18 living with them, 21.1% were married couples living together, 39.2% had a female householder with no husband present, and 32.4% were non-families. 27.9% of all households were made up of individuals, and 12.7% had someone living alone who was 65 years of age or older.  The average household size was 2.98 and the average family size was 3.66.

In the CDP, the population was spread out, with 35.0% under the age of 18, 10.0% from 18 to 24, 25.7% from 25 to 44, 17.4% from 45 to 64, and 11.9% who were 65 years of age or older.  The median age was 29 years. For every 100 females, there were 83.7 males.  For every 100 females age 18 and over, there were 75.2 males.

The median income for a household in the CDP was $16,902, and the median income for a family was $19,703. Males had a median income of $21,098 versus $21,182 for females. The per capita income for the CDP was $9,722.  About 37.4% of families and 42.7% of the population were below the poverty line, including 54.6% of those under age 18 and 33.2% of those age 65 or over.

As of 2000, speakers of English as a first language accounted for 89.22% of residents, while Spanish made up 10.22% of the population, and French Creole made up 0.53% of all residents.

Education
Miami-Dade County Public Schools operates area public schools.

Elementary schools
Lorah Park Elementary School
Kelsey L. Pharr Elementary School
Olinda Elementary School
Earlington Heights Elementary School
Charles Drew Elementary School

Middle schools
Brownsville Middle School
Charles Drew Middle School
Miami Springs Middle School
Georgia Jones-Ayers Middle School

High schools
Miami Northwestern Senior High School
Miami Jackson Senior High School
Miami Springs Senior High School

Libraries
Miami-Dade Public Library operates area public libraries:

Model City Library

Transportation
Brownsville is served by Miami-Dade Transit along major thoroughfares via Metrobus, and by the Miami Metrorail, Tri-Rail, and Amtrak at:

Metrorail:
  Brownsville (North 54th Street and West 27th Avenue)
  Dr. Martin Luther King Jr. Plaza (North 62nd Street and West 27th Avenue)

Tri-Rail:
  Tri-Rail/Metrorail Transfer (North 79th Street and West 37th Avenue)
  Hialeah Market (North 41st Street and NW 38th Avenue)

Amtrak:
  Amtrak-Miami: Silver Star and Silver Meteor service, (North 79th Street and West 37th Avenue)

References

Unincorporated communities in Miami-Dade County, Florida
Census-designated places in Miami-Dade County, Florida
Census-designated places in Florida
Unincorporated communities in Florida